The Yanji Nationwide Fitness Centre Stadium (Simplified Chinese: 延吉市全民健身中心体育场), also known as Yanji New Stadium (Simplified Chinese: 延吉新体育场) or Yanji People's Stadium (Simplified Chinese: 延吉人民体育场), is a multi-purpose stadium in Yanji, Yanbian Korean Autonomous Prefecture, Jilin, China. It is currently used mostly for association football matches. The stadium holds 30,000 people, and is the home stadium of Yanbian Funde F.C. It was built in August 2010 to replace the Yanji People's Stadium and opened in November 2013, at a cost of 220 million RMB.

References

Football venues in China
Athletics (track and field) venues in China
Sports venues in Jilin
Multi-purpose stadiums in China
Sports venues completed in 2013
Buildings and structures in Yanbian
Sport in Yanbian